George Beal may refer to:

George Lafayette Beal (1825–1896), Maine politician and American Civil War general
George M. Beal, architect of Chewning House (Lawrence, Kansas)

See also
George Beall (1729–1807), a wealthy landowner in Maryland and Georgetown in what is now Washington, D.C.
George Beall (attorney) (1937–2017), a U.S. attorney who prosecuted Vice President Spiro Agnew for bribery
George Beel (1900–1980), an English professional footballer